Charles Edward Lord OBE JP (born 13 January 1972) is a politician, non-executive director, consultant, and a sports administrator. They have been an elected member of the City of London Court of Common Council since February 2001, most recently re-elected in March 2017. They are currently chair of the city's Establishment Committee, leading on workforce and inclusion policy and member of the powerful Policy and Resources Committee. Lord was Chair of Local Partnerships LLP from 2009 to 2012 and served on Executive of the Local Government Association from 2008 to 2012 and the LGA Improvement and Innovation Board from 2004 to 2013, where 
they led on equality and social inclusion. From February 2011 to July 2018 Lord was chair of Capital Ambition in which role they served on the Leaders' Committee of London Councils. Lord was Group Board Chair of the Amateur Swimming Association, the English national governing body for swimming, diving and water polo from 2013 to 2015 and has held a number of appointments within the Football Association.  Lord was appointed an OBE for public service in June 2011.

Early life and education 
Born near Rochdale, Lancashire, son of Charles Andrew Lord, a leather merchant, and Vivienne Marie Fairbank (now Brittain), a teacher, Lord attended the independent Bury Grammar School from 1976 to 1990 and the University of Essex, reading Public Policy & Public Management in the Government Department. Whilst at Essex, Lord was Chair of the Students' Union Council and a student member of University Senate. Lord graduated from Essex in 1994 and was appointed to the Court of the University in 2011 and its Audit and Risk Management Committee in 2017.

Party politics 
Lord joined the Rochdale Conservative & Unionist Association in 1987, after protesting at the secrecy of the Labour-run Rochdale Metropolitan Borough Council's budget. That same year he re-formed, and became chairman of, Rochdale Young Conservatives, going on to be elected secretary of the North West Area Young Conservatives in 1990 (becoming senior vice chairman in 1991 and vice-president from 1992 to 1995). Lord was a member of the national executive committee of the National Union of Conservative and Unionist Associations from 1991 to 1994 and of the Young Conservatives National Advisory Committee from 1991 to 1995.

In 1994, Lord became the first Conservative to be elected to the national executive of the National Union of Students for over a decade. Re-elected in 1995, he served as chair of the Social Policy Committee and took the chair at the NUS national conferences in 1995 and 1996.

Lord acted as candidate's aide to John Whittingdale OBE MP in South Colchester & Maldon in the 1992 General Election and to John Marshall in Finchley & Golders Green in 1997. In 2002, Lord was approved for the Conservative parliamentary candidates' list.

In 2003, Lord joined the Norris for London campaign as deputy director, working to campaign director Mark MacGregor.

In November 2003, Michael Howard succeeded Iain Duncan Smith as Conservative Party leader, which provoked Lord to resign from the Party and join the Liberal Democrats

Lord immediately became a fundraising adviser to the then party treasurer, Reg Clark, becoming deputy party treasurer to Lord Clement-Jones in July 2005. He stepped down from that role when Menzies Campbell became Leader the following year, Lord having been election agent to failed leadership candidate Mark Oaten.

In January 2011, Lord was elected to the Party's Finance and Administration Committee, the operational board which oversees the Headquarters, including staffing, finance, fundraising, membership and compliance, serving until 2017.

City of London 
Lord was elected to the City of London Court of Common Council for the Ward of Coleman Street in February 2001 at the age of 29. In 2009, Lord changed wards to Farringdon Without, the city's largest ward, and in March 2012 was appointed by the Ward Alderman, Simon Walsh, as his Deputy. Walsh did not seek re-election as Alderman in May 2013 and with his retirement, Lord lost the office of Ward Deputy. In 2017, Lord was re-appointed as Deputy by newly elected Alderman Gregory Jones QC.

He was chair of the city's Licensing Committee from 2010 to 2013 and chair of the Standards Committee from 2013 to 2016, and now chairs of the Establishment Committee, leading on workforce and inclusion policy, deputy chair of the Capital Buildings Committee and a member of the senior Policy and Resources Committee as well as the City Bridge Trust Committee. Lord is also a Governor of the City of London School.

Lord is a Liveryman of the Broderers' Company and a Freeman of the Leathersellers' Company and Fletchers' Company, having become a Freeman of the City of London in January 2000.

Local government 
First appointed to the Improvement Board of the Local Government Association (LGA) in 2004 as one of its inaugural deputy chair, serving under Sir Simon Milton, Lord was the Board's longest serving member until standing down in July 2013 and was the LGA's lead member for equality and social inclusion.

In 2005, Lord was appointed as chair of the Public Private Partnerships Programme (4ps), the LGA's in house adviser on the private finance initiative. In 2009 they led the merger with Partnerships UK plc to become Local Partnerships LLP, which is jointly owned by the LGA and HM Treasury and acts as the commercial and efficiency taskforce for councils and other local public bodies in England and Wales. Lord retired as chair of Local Partnerships in November 2012, but remained a Non-Executive Director until July 2017.

Lord was also a member of the LGA's governing National Executive from 2008–12. They served in 2008–09 as chair of the 'Getting Closer' Member Task Group overseeing the implementation of the LGA Group Development Strategy and in 2009–10 on the Member Task Group on local government investment and treasury management arrangements. Lord led the early stages of the LGA's work on promoting the development of municipal bonds to fund local infrastructure projects.

In 2010, Lord was appointed to the board of Capital Ambition, the regional improvement and efficiency partnership for Greater London, and in February 2011 became chair of a reorganised board, also joining the Leaders' Committee of London Councils, serving until June 2018.

Lord is a graduate of the Local Government Leadership Academy.

Non-political career 
Lord's career immediately after graduation mainly centred around public relations and fundraising, working in various roles for the National Playing Fields Association, Otto Schiff Housing Association and British Friends of the Hebrew University of Jerusalem. In 1998, Lord became development director of Liverpool John Moores University and from 2000 to 2002 held the same role at the City University London.

Since leaving City University, Lord has worked freelance advising on stakeholder engagement, governance, philanthropy, and risk, trading initially as Edward Lord Consultants, now Edward Lord Limited. Lord has also taken interim roles for a number of charities, including ten months as permanent secretary to Imperial College Union and seven months as external relations director at children's charity Coram. In October 2013, they joined breast cancer charity The Haven as part-time fundraising and development director, serving until May 2014.

On 1 January 2011, Lord became a non-executive director of Parkwood Holdings plc, a specialist support services group providing outsourced greenspace and leisure management for local authorities and other organisations, a role they held until May 2012, leaving after the company de-listed from the Stock Exchange. In January 2013, Lord became a non-executive director of the Social Investment Business Group serving until June 2017.

Lord's other public appointments have included being deputy chair of the Whittington Hospital NHS Trust and board member of the College of Optometrists, Council for the Registration of Forensic Practitioners and London Strategic Housing.

In August 2018, Lord became a Governor of the University of Northampton.

Sports Administration 
Lord was deputy chair of the City of London Corporation's 2012 Committee, leading on all aspects of the city's engagement with the London 2012 Olympic and Paralympic Games and was granted a full accreditation at both Games.

In late 2012, Lord joined the Inclusion Advisory Group of the London Football Association, becoming its chairman in February 2013. In October 2013 they were appointed by the Football Association to chair anti-discrimination related disciplinary commissions and in December 2013 as a member of the FA Inclusion Advisory Board.

In May 2014, Lord went public with his concerns about the conduct of Richard Scudamore, Chief Executive of the Premier League whom the Sunday Mirror revealed had sent a range of sexist and discriminatory emails. Lord, as a member of the FA IAB (albeit in a personal capacity) questioned whether the Football Association should charge Scudamore with bringing the game into disrepute.

Lord was removed from the FA Inclusion Advisory Board in September 2014 after giving an interview to The Daily Telegraph in which they criticised the Association for its inaction in tackling high level discrimination in the game, citing the Scudamore incident and several others. Lord's removal provoked a letter of support in the Daily Telegraph from a range of high-profile figures in sport, politics, and the voluntary sector.

In September 2013, Lord was appointed as Chair of the Group Board of the Amateur Swimming Association, the English national governing body for swimming, diving, water polo and synchronised swimming, a role they held until standing down in May 2015, following the delivery of a major change in the ASA's governance and senior management.

In the summer of 2018, Lord was appointed an independent director designate of the British Basketball League.

Law and Judicial Office 
Lord became a Justice of the Peace for the City of London in 2002 and, since 2007, has been sitting in the appellate jurisdiction of the Crown Court at the Old Bailey and Southwark Crown Court. Taking a particular judicial interest in civil liberties, their appeal cases have included a number relating to Brian Haw's peace camp in London's Parliament Square and, in October 2012, nine of the defendants from UK Uncut's protest at Fortnum & Mason during the 26 March 2011 anti-cuts protests. Lord was elected as deputy chair of the Central London Bench, taking office in April 2018.

Lord was admitted to the Honourable Society of the Middle Temple in 2008, remaining a student member as they withdrew from their Graduate Diploma in Law course at BPP Law School in 2009 due to pressure of professional commitments.

Equality and Human Rights 
In addition to serving as the LGA's lead member for diversity, Lord has been an active advocate for equality across a range of fields, most notably for LGBT people. In April 2012 they were profiled as an openly bisexual politician in Stonewall's role model publication sent to thousands of schools and employers. They have been a trustee or board member of The Albert Kennedy Trust; Anne Frank Trust (UK); British Youth Council; Pride Trust; and Refugee Council. In November 2012, it was announced that Lord had been appointed to the Ministerial steering group for the review of the Public Sector Equality Duty, which reported in September 2013. In April 2015, Lord was elected as Bisexual People's Representative to the Community Advisory Board for Pride in London (serving until May 2018) having already been a trustee of bisexual charity BiCon Continuity and research and activist group BiUK. In July 2018, it was reported in the Sunday Times and Daily Telegraph that Lord now identifies as non-binary and uses the pronoun 'they'.

Lobbying controversy
In December 2011 Lord was caught up in a "sting" by the Bureau of Investigative Journalism and The Independent, who posed as representatives of Uzbekistan in a meeting with lobbyist BTP. In footage of the meeting Lord described themself as having a "non-executive" role with BTP, but subsequently explained that they attended the meeting as a favour to BTP's managing director, fellow Liberal Democrat Mark Pursey, and that they had never worked for BTP.

Freemasonry
Lord is a freemason and is a Grand Officer and former chair of the Universities Scheme of the United Grand Lodge of England. They are a Member or Honorary Member of a number of Masonic lodges. In responding to charges of hypocrisy of being both a freemason and a diversity campaigner, Lord told the Daily Telegraph that  "It is something I continue to struggle with and continue to think about. If it was entirely up to me I would change things, but you have to take 250,000 members with you. I've spoken fairly freely on this subject and the fact that Freemasons could be more welcoming and inclusive The one area I would change is on gender".

References

External links
 Personal website
 LGA Leading Member's biography
 Debrett's People of Today
 Local Partnerships

1972 births
Living people
Alumni of the University of Essex
Councillors in Greater London
Liberal Democrats (UK) councillors
People educated at Bury Grammar School
People associated with Liverpool John Moores University
People associated with City, University of London
Bisexual politicians
Bisexual men
English LGBT politicians
People from Rochdale
Freemasons of the United Grand Lodge of England
Councilmen of the City of London